The Plinth Assemblage, also known as the Plinth Formation, is an accreted terrane of igneous rocks in southwestern British Columbia, Canada, located just north of the Lillooet River and on the northern flank of the Mount Meager massif. It is named after Plinth Peak, a peak made of Plinth Assemblage rocks.

This geological formation is one of the largest comprising the Mount Meager massif. Formed during an onset of volcanic activity about 100,000 years ago, the Plinth Assemblage consists of light grey porphyritic rhyodacite with phenocrysts of plagioclase, quartz, minor biotite and rare hornblende. The  of Mount Meager itself is made of Plinth Assemblage rocks and was the southern source of Plinth Assemblage lava flows and breccias.

The Plinth Assemblage represents a minor portion of the Pacific Ranges of the southern Coast Mountains.

See also
Job Assemblage
Mosaic Assemblage
Capricorn Assemblage
The Devastator Assemblage
Pylon Assemblage
Volcanism of Western Canada
List of Cascade volcanoes
List of volcanoes in Canada

References

Mount Meager massif
Volcanism of British Columbia
Geologic formations of British Columbia
Pleistocene volcanism